Macrobathra rhodospila is a moth in the family Cosmopterigidae. It was described by Edward Meyrick in 1886. It is found in Australia, where it has been recorded from New South Wales.

References

Macrobathra
Moths described in 1886